The Sparrow (1996) is the first novel by author Mary Doria Russell.
It won the Arthur C. Clarke Award, James Tiptree, Jr. Award, Kurd-Laßwitz-Preis and the British Science Fiction Association Award. It was followed by a sequel, Children of God, in 1998. The title refers to Gospel of Matthew 10:29–31, which relates that not even a sparrow falls to the earth without God's knowledge thereof.

Plot 
In the year 2019, the SETI program at Arecibo Observatory discovers radio broadcasts of music from the vicinity of Alpha Centauri. The first expedition to Rakhat, the world that is sending the music, is organized by the Society of Jesus (Jesuits), known for its missionary, linguistic and scientific activities since the time of its founder, Ignatius of Loyola. In the year 2060, only one of the crew, the Jesuit priest Emilio Sandoz, survives to return to Earth, and he is damaged physically and psychologically. The story is told with parallel plot lines, interspersing the journey of Sandoz and his friends to Rakhat with Sandoz's experiences upon his return to Earth.

Father Sandoz is a talented Puerto Rican linguist. He is described as of mixed Taíno and Conquistador heritage and character. Sandoz grew up in La Perla, a poor neighborhood in San Juan. He joined the Jesuits as a teenager. After several stints at Jesuit missionaries around the world, he returns to Puerto Rico. Several of his close friends and co-workers, people with a variety of unique skills and talents, have seemingly coincidental connections to Arecibo. One of them, a gifted young technician, was the first to hear the transmissions; another, Sofia Mendes, a Turkish Jewish artificial intelligence specialist, has the connections and aptitude to obtain a spacecraft and help pilot the mission. Sandoz, who has often struggled with his faith, becomes convinced that only God's will could bring this group of people with the perfect combination of knowledge and experience together at the moment when the alien signal was detected. Sandoz and his friends, along with three other Jesuit priests, are chosen by the Society of Jesus to travel in secret to the planet, using an interstellar vessel made with a small asteroid.

Upon reaching Rakhat, the crew tries to acclimatize themselves to the new world, experimenting with eating local flora and fauna, then making contact with a rural village, inhabited by a peaceful tribe of herbivore gatherers, the Runa. Though the Runa are clearly not the singers of the radio broadcasts, the Earthlings settle among them and begin to learn their language Ruanja and culture. Although Sandoz struggles with his attraction to Sofia, he finds greater spiritual meaning in his interactions with the Runa. The crew transmits all their findings via computer uplink to the asteroid-ship in orbit. One day, in an attempt to retrieve supplies from their landing vehicle for a sick crew member, the landing vehicle runs short of the fuel needed to safely return to the asteroid ship, and the crew must face the reality that they may never return to Earth.

When the Earthlings finally meet a member of the culture which produced the radio transmissions, he proves to be of an entirely different species from the rural natives, a Jana'ata who is an ambitious merchant named Supaari VaGayjur. Supaari VaGayjur sees in the visitors a possibility to improve his status, while the crew hopes to find an alternative source of fuel in Supaari's city, Gayjur. Meanwhile, the crew begins to grow their own food, introducing the concept of agriculture to the villagers. These seemingly innocent actions and accompanying cultural misunderstandings precipitate an outbreak of violence. Though not closely related genetically, the Jana'ata have evolved by aggressive mimicry to physically resemble the Runa, who are in fact their prey species. The human introduction of agriculture leads to a Runa baby boom which is harvested by the predatory Jana'ata. The humans are riven with guilt over their misguided action, and most, including Sofia, are killed when defending against the Jana'ata attack. Only Sandoz and one other human survive, and Sandoz endures capture, degradation, and a crisis of faith. Eventually found by Supaari, Sandoz's hands are disfigured and rendered useless in a Jana'ata practice meant to convey the honor and privilege of being dependent on another, a mutilation analogous to the practice of foot binding. The mutilation kills the other surviving crew member; Sandoz survives, though he is physically and spiritually traumatized,  believing himself at fault for the death of his friends. Later, Supaari gives Sandoz to the Reshtar of Galatna, a poet and musician, in exchange for the right to have a wife and start his own lineage. Held captive by the Reshtar, Sandoz realizes the Reshtar is the source of the music that brought the humans to Rakhat and momentarily regains his faith; however, the Reshtar is only interested in Sandoz as a pet who is forced to sexually satisfy the musician, along with his friends and colleagues. It is later revealed that the Reshtar broadcasts songs about his sexual exploits, songs which may have been heard on Earth.

When Sandoz returns to Earth in 2060, his friends are dead, and his faith, once considered worthy of canonization by his superiors, has turned into bitter anger with the God who inspired him to go to Rakhat. Due to relativistic space-time effects, decades had passed while he has been gone, during which popular outrage at the United Nations' initial and highly out-of-context report on the mission, 
especially Sandoz's role in the tragedy, had left the Society of Jesus shattered, nearly extinct. The Jesuits shelter Sandoz from the media and help him recover physically, while the Father Superior selects a panel of Jesuit priests from around the world to help Sandoz come out of his shell and explain what really happened. Initially bent on discovering the truth, the other priests eventually recognize the great personal cost at which the journey came, and accept Sandoz's epic struggle with his faith. Over the course of several months, Sandoz painfully explains his story and begins his personal healing.

Similarities to other works 
The Sparrow is similar to James Blish's science fiction novel A Case of Conscience. It also involves a Jesuit priest confronting an alien civilization. Mary Doria Russell has addressed this speculation:

Literary significance and reception
Nancy Pearl, reviewing in the Library Journal, felt that this book was mistakenly categorized as science fiction, and that it is really "a philosophical novel about the nature of good and evil and what happens when a man tries to do the right thing, for the right reasons and ends up causing incalculable harm".

In the Catholic journal Commonweal, Paul Q. Kane writes that Russell has done her research on the early historic Jesuit missions and on Jesuit spirituality. He continues that she is successfully updating the stories of other important Jesuits who have sent men to distant lands or went themselves to foreign cultures to represent Christianity. "Russell subtly raises concerns about the ways in which sophisticated cultures tell themselves cover stories in order to justify actions taken at a terrible cost to others". This is also reflected in the way that Sofia has to buy her freedom from what she describes as an institution of intellectual prostitution; as well as the differences between the simple Runa who live in the countryside and the Jana'ata, who are the sophisticated city dwellers that created the beautiful music which triggered the mission originally.

Awards and nominations 
 The 1996 James Tiptree, Jr. Award
 The 1998 Arthur C. Clarke Award
 The 1998 BSFA Award for Best Novel
 The 1998 John W. Campbell Award for Best New Writer
 The 2001 Kurd Laßwitz Award
 The 2001 Gaylactic Spectrum Hall of Fame (The Sparrow and Children of God together)

Film, television and theatrical adaptations 
In March 2006 it was announced that Warner Bros. had purchased the rights to The Sparrow for Brad Pitt's production company, Plan B, and that Pitt himself would be playing the role of Sandoz with screenwriter Michael Seitzman adapting the novel to film.

Since then, Mary Russell has revoked all film rights, believing that Hollywood cannot and will not make a film version of The Sparrow that is faithful to the book. She has written her own screenplay with her assistant Karen Hall, but has realized it has little to no chance of being produced.

In 2014, AMC announced it was developing a television adaptation of the book.

In 2021, Scott Frank announced his plans to adapt The Sparrow as a miniseries, to be presented on FX. Johan Renck is being looked at to direct, with Frank, Renck, and Mark Johnson signed on as executive producers.

Related works 
 James Blish's A Case of Conscience also has a Jesuit priest confronting an alien civilization.
 In Arthur C. Clarke's short story "The Star" a Jesuit scientist finds out a faith-shaking fact about a supernova.
 Stanisław Lem's Fiasco is also about first contact SETI mission and has a priest (although Dominican) as one of prominent secondary characters.
 Michel Faber's The Book of Strange New Things is a novel about a pastor sent as a missionary to an alien species. 
 Progressive/symphonic rock band Metaphor has produced a concept album/rock opera based on The Sparrow (with the author's permission). The CD was released in September 2007.

Publication history 
 1996, US, Villard , Pub date 9 September 1996, Hardcover
 1996, US, Brilliance Corp , Pub date 1 October 1996, Audio Cassette
 1997, US, Ballantine Books , Pub date 8 September 1997, Paperback
 1997, UK, Black Swan , Pub date 1 November 1997, Paperback
 2008, US, Brilliance Audio , Pub date 4 April 2008, Audio CD

Notes

External links 
The following links are to detailed reviews with many plot details.
 First review of The Sparrow by R.W. Rasband, Association for Mormon Letters.
 Second review of The Sparrow by Rasband, with Russell's response.
 Review of Children of God by Rasband.
 Infinity Plus Interview with Mary Doria Russell where she discusses The Sparrow.
 Video clip of interview with Mary Doria Russell and NPR Book Reviewer Alan Cheuse talking about faith and fiction in The Sparrow.
 Mary Doria Russell personal website.

1996 American novels
1996 debut novels
Alpha Centauri in fiction
American philosophical novels
American science fiction novels
Catholic novels
Fiction set in 2019
Interpreting and translation in fiction
James Tiptree Jr. Award-winning works
Novels set on fictional planets
Religion in science fiction
Villard (imprint) books